José Miguel Ruiz Cortés (born 6 June 1983), commonly known as José Ruiz, is a Spanish futsal player who plays for ElPozo Murcia as a Defender.

References

External links
LNFS profile
UEFA profile

1983 births
Living people
Sportspeople from Barcelona
Spanish men's futsal players
FC Barcelona Futsal players
ElPozo Murcia FS players